Tristan Island is a small rocky island  west of Yseult Island and  north of the west point on Cape Jules. Photographed from the air by U.S. Navy Operation Highjump, 1946–47. Charted by the French Antarctic Expedition under Barre, 1951–52, and so named because of its twin relationship with Yseult Island. Tristan is the popular spelling of Tristram, legendary hero incorporated into Arthurian legend and later popularized by Richard Wagner's opera Tristan und Isolde.

See also 
 List of Antarctic and sub-Antarctic islands

Islands of Adélie Land